Al Isma'iliyah may refer to:
 Ismaïlia, Egypt
 Ismailia Governorate, Egypt

See also
Isma'ilism